Kazakh State Circus (Russian: Казахский государственный цирк, tr: Kazakhskiy gosudarstevnnyi ts'irk) is a main circus of Kazakhstan located in Almaty.

History 
Circus building was opened in 1972. In 1980, the circus became Honored Collective of the Kazakh SSR.

After the collapse of the Soviet Union, many artists from Soyuzgostsirk have moved to Alma-Ata, which has allowed to create a new team that has repeatedly had successful tours in China.

In 1983, the artists Murat and Elizaveta Zhumagaliev were awarded the main award of Eduarde Basse at the international competition in Prague. Dosbatyrov circus artists - winners of International festivals of circus art held in Verona (Italy), Belgium, Monte Carlo and China. Artists T. Trestin and Zh. Bakenova won first place in the European competition in Poland. Laureates and medalists of the competition in China were the artists of the "Air flight" (1993) under the hands of A. Kirichenko, Ph. A.Kirichenko, dzhigits under the direction of K. Kunguzhinov, the number "Ren wheels" performed by V. Gashuta. In the American circus performs a group of Kazakh jigit-riders under the guidance of. K. Chalabaeva.The entertainment center "Harlequino" was opened on the territory of the circus in 2000. Riding school was founded in 2001.

Architecture 
The Kazakh circus building was constructed on the direct initiative of the First Secretary of the Communist Party of the Kazakh SSR Dinmukhamed Kunayev.

The circus has been working in its own new building since 1972.

Monumental status 
A new State List of Historical and Cultural Monuments of Local Significance in Almaty was approved on 10 November 2010, which gave the theatre its monumental status.

References 

Circuses
Entertainment venues in Almaty
1970 establishments in Kazakh Soviet Socialist Republic
Event venues established in 1970